Ivan Milovanov (born 8 February 1989) is a Russian futsal player who plays for KPRF and the Russian national futsal team.

References

External links
UEFA profile
AMFR profile

1989 births
Living people
Futsal forwards
Russian men's futsal players